Caenina may refer to:

Aroa, a moth genus in the family Erebidae
Pantana, a moth genus in the family Erebidae
Caenina (town), a town nearby ancient Rome